Nationality words link to articles with information on the nation's poetry or literature (for instance, Irish or France).

Events
 1 May 1999 — Andrew Motion becomes Poet Laureate of the United Kingdom for 10 years
 1 July 1999 — Scotland's Parliament opens with the singing of Robert Burns' "A Man's a Man For A'That", instead of "God Save The Queen"
 4 October 1999 — In the United States, New Jersey Governor Christine Todd Whitman signs into law Assembly Bill No. 2714 (P.L. 1999, c. 228) sent to her from the state legislature and creates the New Jersey William Carlos Williams Citation of Merit—effectively, Poet Laureate of New Jersey. Whitman subsequently selected poet Gerald Stern (b. 1925), then a resident of Lambertville, New Jersey as the first appointed to the post in the following April.
 The Robert Fitzgerald Prosody Award is established at the Fifth Annual West Chester University Poetry Conference. The award is given to scholars who have made a lasting contribution to the art and science of versification. Derek Attridge is the first winner
 Carl Rakosi's 99th birthday celebrated at the Kelly Writers House with a live audiocast
 A new grave slab is installed at the Greyfriars Kirkyard in Edinburgh over the final resting place of William Topaz McGonagall (1825–1904), comically renowned as the worst poet in the English language; the slab is inscribed:

William McGonagall
Poet and Tragedian

"I am your gracious Majesty
ever faithful to Thee,
William McGonagall, the Poor Poet,
That lives in Dundee."

Works published in English
Listed by nation where the work was first published and again by the poet's native land, if different; substantially revised works listed separately:

Australia
 Robert Adamson, Black Water: Approaching Zukofsky
 Jennifer Maiden, Mines, Paper Bark, 
 Les Murray:
 Fredy Neptune, verse novel, winner of the 2005 Premio Mondello (in Italy)
 New Selected Poems, Duffy & Snellgrove
 Conscious and Verbal, Carcanet, Duffy & Snellgrove

Canada
 Ken Babstock, Mean, his first book of poetry, winner of the Atlantic Poetry Prize and the Milton Acorn People's Poet Award (Canada)
 Afua Cooper, editor, Utterances and Incantations: Women, Poetry and Dub, Toronto: Sister Vision Press (scholarship)
 Jeffery Donaldson, Waterglass, McGill-Queen's University Press
 George Elliott Clarke, Gold Indigoes. Durham: Carolina Wren, 
 Susan Holbrook, misled
 Tim Lilburn, To the River, winner of the Saskatchewan Book Award for Book of the Year
 A. F. Moritz, Rest on the Flight into Egypt
 Andy Quan and Jim Wong-Chu, editors, Swallowing Clouds: An Anthology of Chinese-Canadian Poetry, Vancouver, British Columbia: Arsenal Pulp Press

India, in English
 Rukmini Bhaya Nair, The Ayodhya Cantos ( Poetry in English ), New Delhi: Penguin
 C. P. Surendran, Posthumous Poems ( Poetry in English ), New Delhi: Penguin (Viking); not posthumously published
 Sudeep Sen:
 Bodytext: Dramatic Monologues in Motion, London Borough of Harrow: Harrow Arts and Leisure Service
 Retracing American Contours, Columbia: University of South Carolina
 Eunice de Souza, editor, Talking Poems: Conversations with Poets, New Delhi: Oxford University Press, 
 E.V. Ramakrishnan, editor, The Tree of Tongues: An Anthology of Modern Indian Poetry, Arundhathi Subramaniam called the volume "a landmark book of translations of modern Indian poetry"; Shimla: Indian Institute of Advanced Study,

Ireland
 Ciaran Carson, The Ballad of HMS Belfast, Oldcastle: The Gallery Press, 
 Vona Groarke, Other People's Houses, Oldcastle: The Gallery Press,
 Joan McBreen, editor, The White Page an bhileog bh'an: Twentieth-Century Irish Women Poets Cliffs of Moher, County Clare: Salmon
 Thomas McCarthy, Mr Dineen's Careful Parade: New and Selected Poems, Anvil Press, London, Irish poet published in the United Kingdom
 Medbh McGuckian and Eiléan Ní Chuilleanáin, translators, The Water Horse: Poems in Irish Nuala Ní Dhomhnaill, Oldcastle: The Gallery Press

New Zealand
 Alistair Campbell, Gallipoli & Other Poems, Wellington: Wai-te-ata Press
 Janet Charman, Rapunzel Rapunzel, Auckland: Auckland University Press
 Leigh Davis, Te Tangi a te Matuhi, Auckland: Jack Books
 Michele Leggott, As far as I can see, Auckland: Auckland University Press
 Robin Hyde, The book of Nadath, introduction and notes by Michele Leggott; Auckland: Auckland University Press, posthumous
 Bill Manhire, What to Call Your Child
 Sarah Quigley, Raewyn Alexander and Anna Jackson, AUP New Poets 1: Sarah Quigley, Raewyn Alexander and Anna Jackson, Auckland: Auckland University Press

United Kingdom
 Mark Bryant, editor, Literary Hymns: An Anthology, London: Hodder & Stoughton
 Gerry Cambridge, Nothing But Heather!, Luath Press 
 Julia Donaldson. The Gruffalo, children's story in verse
 Carol Ann Duffy:
 Meeting Midnight, Faber and Faber (children's poetry)
 The World's Wife, Anvil Press Poetry
 Seamus Heaney:
 The Light of the Leaves, Bonnefant Press
 Translator: Beowulf, Faber & Faber
 Translator: Diary of One Who Vanished, a song cycle by Leoš Janáček of poems by Ozef Kalda, Faber & Faber
 John Heath-Stubbs, The Sound of Light
 Ted Hughes, translator:
 Aeschylus: The Oresteia
 Alcestis
 Kathleen Jamie, Jizzen
 Andrew Johnston, The Open Window, Arc Publications, New Zealand poet living in Paris, France
 Anne MacLeod, Just the Caravaggio, Scottish poet
 Derek Mahon, Collected Poems, Gallery Press
 Don Paterson, The Eyes
 Tom Paulin, The Wind Dog
 Peter Reading, Apophthegmatic
 Peter Redgrove, Selected Poems
 Mary Jo Salter, A Kiss in Space, Knopf
 Marina Tsvetayeva, The Selected Poems of Marina Tsvetayeva, translated by Elaine Feinstein, fifth edition, with new poems and a new introduction, Oxford University Press/Carcanet
 Hugo Williams, Billy's Rain, Faber and Faber

Anthologies in the United Kingdom
 Richard Caddel and Peter Quartermain, editors, Other: British and Irish Poetry since 1970, an anthology of poetry outside The Movement (essentially the mainstream) of English and Irish poetry (Wesleyan University Press)
 Carol Ann Duffy, editor, Time's Tidings: Greeting the 21st Century, Anvil Press Poetry
 Elaine Feinstein, editor, After Pushkin, "versions by contemporary poets", published by the Folio Society and Carcanet
 Iona Opie, editor, Here Comes Mother Goose, a collection of nursery rhymes
 Michael Schmidt, The Harvill Book of Twentieth-Century Poetry in English
 Adam Schwartzman, editor, Ten South African poets, Manchester: Carcanet

United States
 John Ashbery, Girls on the Run, a book-length poem inspired by the work of artist Henry Darger
 Joseph Brodsky: Discovery, New York: Farrar, Straus & Giroux Russian-American
 Jared Carter, Les Barricades Mysterieuses, Cleveland State University Poetry Center.
 Robert Dassanowsky, Telegrams from the Metropole. Selected Poems 1980-1998 
 Rita Dove, On the Bus with Rosa Parks (Norton); a New York Times "notable book of the year"
 Beth Gylys, Bodies that Hum (Silverfish Review Press); winner of the Gerald Cable Book Award
 Geoffrey Hill, The Triumph of Love (Houghton Mifflin); a New York Times "notable book of the year"
 John Hollander, Figurehead and Other Poems
 Fanny Howe, Forged
 William Logan, Night Battle
 Glyn Maxwell, The Breakage, (Houghton Mifflin); a New York Times "notable book of the year"
 W. S. Merwin, The River Sound: Poems, New York: Knopf; a New York Times "notable book of the year"
 Eugenio Montale, Collected Poems: 1920-1954 (Farrar, Straus & Giroux);  a New York Times "notable book of the year"; translated from Italian
 Mary Oliver, Winter Hours: Prose, Prose Poems, and Poems
 Michael Palmer, The Danish Notebook (Avec Books); memoir/poetic essay. 
 George Quasha (with Chie Hasegawa), Ainu Dreams (Station Hill Press)
 Carl Rakosi, The Old Poet's Tale
 Kenneth Rexroth, Swords That Shall Not Strike: Poems of Protest and Rebellion (Glad Day; posthumous)
 Charles Simic, Jackstraws: Poems (Harcourt Brace); a New York Times "notable book of the year"
 A. E. Stallings, Archaic Smile
 Mark Strand, Chicken, Shadow, Moon & More, by a Canadian native long living in and published in the United States
 Eleanor Ross Taylor, Late Leisure
 Melvin B. Tolson, Harlem Gallery: And Other Poems (University Press of Virginia); a New York Times "notable book of the year"
 Rosmarie Waldrop, Reluctant Gravities (New Directions)
 Jesse Lee Kercheval, World as Dictionary

Criticism, scholarship and biography in the United States
 M. H. Abrams, A Glossary of Literary Terms (first published in 1958), goes into its seventh edition, Fort Worth, Texas: Harcourt Brace
 Charles Bernstein, A Poetics (Cambridge: Harvard University Press)
 Molly Peacock, How to Read a Poem ... and Start a Poetry Circle, New York: Riverhead Books

Anthologies in the United States
 Riohard Caddel and Peter Quartermain, editors, Other: British and Irish Poetry since 1970 Wesleyan University Press
 Ed Dorn and Gordon Brotherston, editors (and Brotherston, translator), Sun Unwound: Original Texts from Occupied America, North Atlantic Books anthology
 Tanure Ojaide and Tijan M. Sallah, editors, The New African Poetry: An Anthology, Boulder, Colorado: Lynne Reinner Publishers
 A. L. Soens, editor, I, the Song : Classical Poetry of Native North America, Salt Lake City: University of Utah Press

Poets in The Best American Poetry 1999
Poems from these 75 poets are in The Best American Poetry 1999, edited by David Lehman, guest editor, Robert Bly:

Dick Allen
John Balaban
Coleman Barks
George Bilgere
Elizabeth Bishop
Chana Bloch
Philip Booth
John Brehm
Hayden Carruth
Lucille Clifton
Billy Collins
Robert Creeley
Lydia Davis
Debra Kang Dean
Chard deNiord

Russell Edson
Lawrence Ferlinghetti
Dan Gerber
Louise Glück
Ray Gonzalez
John Haines
Donald Hall
Jennifer Michael Hecht
Bob Hicok
Jane Hirshfield
Tony Hoagland
John Hollander
Amy Holman
David Ignatow
Gray Jacobik

Josephine Jacobsen
Louis Jenkins
Mary Karr
X. J. Kennedy
Galway Kinnell
Carolyn Kizer
Ron Koertge
Yusef Komunyakaa
William Kulik
James Laughlin
Dorianne Laux
Li-Young Lee
Denise Levertov
Philip Levine
David Mamet

Gigi Marks
William Matthews
Wesley McNair
Czesław Miłosz
Joan Murray
Sharon Olds
Mary Oliver
Franco Pagnucci
Molly Peacock
Alberto Ríos
David Ray
Adrienne Rich
Kay Ryan
Sonia Sanchez
Revan Schendler

Myra Shapiro
Charles Simic
Louis Simpson
Thomas R. Smith
Marcia Southwick
William Stafford
Peggy Steele
Ruth Stone
Larissa Szporluk
Diane Thiel
David Wagoner
Richard Wilbur
C.K. Williams
Charles Wright
Timothy Young

Works published in other languages
Listed by nation where the work was first published and again by the poet's native land, if different; substantially revised works listed separately:

French language
 Yves Bonnefoy, La Pluie d'été, France
 Claude Esteban, Janvier, février, mars. Pages, Farrago; France
 Madeleine Gagnon, Rêve de pierre, Montréal, VLB; Canada
 Michel Houellebecq, Renaissance, poèmes, Flammarion; France
 Valérie Rouzeau, Pas revoir, France

Hungary
 György Petri, Amíg lehet

India
In each section, listed in alphabetical order by first name:

Bengali
 Joy Goswami Suryo-Pora Chhai, Kolkata: Ananda Publishers, 
 Mallika Sengupta, Kathamanabi, Kolkata: Ananda Publishers
 Nirendranath Chakravarti, Onno Gopal, Kolkata: Ananda Publishers
 Udaya Narayana Singh, Anukriti, New Delhi: Sahitya Akademi
 NOBBOIER KOBITA, An anthology of poetry 1990s Bangladesh, edited by Mahbub Kabir, Loak Prokashana, Shahbag, Dhaka.

Malayalam
 K. Satchidanandan, Theranjedutha Kavithakal, selected poems; Malayalam-language
 P. P. Ramachandran, Kanekkane, winner of the Kerala Sahitya Akademi Award for poetry: Kottayam: DC Books
 Veerankutty, Jalabhoopadam ("Mapping the Waters"), Kozhikode: Papillon

Marathi
 Dilip Chitre, Ekoon Kavita – 3, Mumbai: Popular Prakashan
 Malika Amar Sheikh:
 Deharutu, Mumbai: Dr Babasaheb Ambedkar Prabodhini
 Mahanagar, Mumbai: Dr Babasaheb Ambedkar Prabodhini

Oriya
 Basudev Sunani, Mahula Bana, Nuapada: Eeshan-Ankit Prakashani
 Bharat Majhi, Agadhu Duari, Varsapallavi, Kendrapara
 Rajendra Kishore Panda, Ishakhela, Cuttack: Cuttack Students' Store

Other in India
 Ajmer Rode, Leela, considered by critics "a landmark volume in modern Punjabi poetry", according to Arundhathi Subramaniam; London, Vancouver: The Rainbird Press, 
 Amarjit Chandan, Guthli, Kitab Tirinjan, Lahore; Punjabi-language
 Chandrakanta Murasingh; Kokborok-language:
 Lok Chethuwang Lok, Krishnanagar: Akshar Publications
 Pindi Watawi Pin, Agartala: Hachukni Khorang Publisher
 Jiban Narah, Suwaranir San, Guwahati, Assam: Jyoti-Prakashan; Assamese-language
 Mamta Sagar, Nadiya Neerina Teva, Bangalore: Ila Prakashana, Kannada-language
 K. Siva Reddy, Telugu-language:
 Varsham, Varsham, Hyderabad: Jhari Poetry Circle
 Jaitrayatra, Hyderabad: Sivareddy Mithrulu
 Thangjam Ibopishak Singh, Mayadesh ("The Land of Maya"), Imphal: Writer's Forum; Meitei language poet and academic
 Vaidehi, pen name of Janaki Srinivasa Murthy, Parijatha, Bangalore: Christ College Kannada Sangha, Kannada-language

Nepal

Poland
 Zbigniew Herbert, Podwójny oddech. Prawdziwa historia nieskończonej miłości. Wiersze dotąd niepublikowane, Gdynia: Małgorzata Marchlewska Wydawnictwo (posthumous)
 Tymoteusz Karpowicz, Słoje zadrzewne ("Tree Rings"), the work stirred "a literary sensation" in Poland, according to critic Tomasz Tabako Wrocław: Wydawnictwo Dolnośląskie
 Ewa Lipska, 1999, Kraków: Wydawnictwo literackie
 Tadeusz Różewicz, Matka odchodzi ("Mother Departs"), Wrocław: Wydawnictwo Dolnośląskie
 Tomasz Różycki, Anima, Zielona Sowa, Kraków
 Jarosław Marek Rymkiewicz, Znak niejasny, baśń półżywa ("The Unclear sign, a Half-living Legend"), Warsaw: Państwowy Instytut Wydawniczy
 Piotr Sommer, Piosenka pasterska
 Jan Twardowski, Miłość miłości szuka, t. 1-2, Warsaw: PIW, Księgarnia i Drukarnia Świętego Wojciecha
 Eugeniusz Tkaczyszyn-Dycki, Kamień pełen pokarmu. Księga wierszy z lat 1987-1999
 Adam Zagajewski, Pragnienie, Kraków: a5

Serbia
 Dejan Stojanović, Sunce sebe gleda (The Sun Watches Itself), Književna reč, Beograd, 1999

Spain
 Matilde Camus:
 Clamor del pensamiento ("Clamour of thought")
 Cancionero multicolor ("Multicolour collection of verses")
 La estrellita Giroldina ("Giroldina the star")

Other languages
 Christoph Buchwald, general editor, and Raoul Schrott, guest editor, Jahrbuch der Lyrik 1999/2000 ("Poetry Yearbook 1999/2000"), publisher: Beck; anthology
 Luo Fu, Silent Falls the Snow, Chinese (Taiwan)
 Aharon Shabtai, Politiqa (Hebrew: "Politics")
 Maria Luisa Spaziani, Italy:
 Un fresco castagneto
 La radice del mare
 Marie Šťastná, Jarním pokrytcům ("To Spring Hypocrites"), Czech Republic
 Yu Jian, Yi mei chuanguo tiankong de dingzi China

Awards and honors
 Nobel prize: Günter Grass

Australia
 C. J. Dennis Prize for Poetry: Gig Ryan, Pure and Applied
 Dinny O'Hearn Poetry Prize: The Impossible, and other Poems by R. A. Simpson
 Kenneth Slessor Prize for Poetry: Lee Cataldi, Race Against Time
 Miles Franklin Award: Murray Bail, Eucalyptus

Canada
 Gerald Lampert Award: Stephanie Bolster, White Stone: The Alice Poems
 Archibald Lampman Award: John Barton, Sweet Ellipsis
 Atlantic Poetry Prize: John Steffler, That Night We Were Ravenous
 1999 Governor General's Awards: Jan Zwicky, Songs for Relinquishing the Earth (English); Herménégilde Chiasson, Conversations (French)
 Pat Lowther Award: Hilary Clark, More Light
 Prix Alain-Grandbois: Hugues Corriveau, Le Livre du frère
 Dorothy Livesay Poetry Prize: David Zieroth, How I Joined Humanity at Last
 Prix Émile-Nelligan: Jean-Éric Riopel, Papillons réfractaires

New Zealand
 Prime Minister's Awards for Literary Achievement:
 Montana New Zealand Book Awards (no poetry winner this year) First-book award for poetry: Kate Camp, Unfamiliar Legends of the Stars, Victoria University Press

United Kingdom
 Cholmondeley Award: Vicki Feaver, Geoffrey Hill, Elma Mitchell, Sheenagh Pugh
 Eric Gregory Award: Ross Cogan, Matthew Hollis, Helen Ivory, Andrew Pidoux, Owen Sheers, Dan Wyke
 Forward Poetry Prize Best Collection: Jo Shapcott, My Life Asleep (Oxford University Press)
 Forward Poetry Prize Best First Collection: Nick Drake, The Man in the White Suit (Bloodaxe)
 Poet Laureate of Great Britain: Andrew Motion appointed
 Samuel Johnson Prize: Antony Beevor, Stalingrad
 T. S. Eliot Prize (United Kingdom and Ireland): Hugo Williams, Billy's Rain
 Whitbread Best Book Award: Seamus Heaney, Beowulf

United States
 Agnes Lynch Starrett Poetry Prize: Daisy Fried, She Didn't Mean To Do It
 Aiken Taylor Award for Modern American Poetry: George Garrett
 Arthur Rense Prize awarded to James McMichael by the American Academy of Arts and Letters
 Bernard F. Connors Prize for Poetry: J.D. McClatchy, "Tattoos"
 Bollingen Prize: Robert Creeley
 Frost Medal: Barbara Guest
 National Book Award for poetry: Ai, Vice: New & Selected Poems
 Special Bicentential Consultants in Poetry to the Library of Congress: Rita Dove, Louise Glück, and W.S. Merwin appointed
 Pulitzer Prize for Poetry: Mark Strand, Blizzard of One
 Robert Fitzgerald Prosody Award: Derek Attridge
 Ruth Lilly Poetry Prize: Maxine Kumin
 Wallace Stevens Award: Jackson Mac Low
 Whiting Awards: Michael Haskell, Terrance Hayes, Martha Zweig
 William Carlos Williams Award: B.H. Fairchild, The Art of the Lathe (Working Classics), Judge: Garrett Hongo
 Fellowship of the Academy of American Poets: Gwendolyn Brooks

Deaths
Birth years link to the corresponding "[year] in poetry" article:
 January 13 – John Frederick Nims, 86, American poet
 February 18 – Felipe Alfau, 96 (born 1902), Spanish-American poet, translator and author
 February 22 – William Bronk, 81, American poet
 May 10 – Shel Silverstein, 68, American children's poet
 July 4 – Mark O'Brien, 49, American poet
 August 15 – Patricia Beer, 79, English poet and critic
 September 8 – Moondog (aka Louis T. Hardin), 83, American street poet
 October 9 – João Cabral de Melo Neto, 79, Brazilian poet and diplomat
 November 14 – Ida Affleck Graves, 97, Indian-born English poet
 November 22 – Sufia Kamal, 88 (born 1911), Bengali poet, writer, organizer, feminist and activist
 December 10 – Edward Dorn, 70, American poet associated with the Black Mountain poets

See also

Poetry
List of years in poetry
List of poetry awards

Notes

20th-century poetry
Poetry